The 1910 Ottawa Rough Riders finished in third place in the Interprovincial Rugby Football Union with a 3–3 record and failed to qualify for the playoffs.

Regular season

Standings

Schedule

References

Ottawa Rough Riders seasons